New Underground Records was an American independent record label founded by Danny Phillips (a.k.a. Danny Dean) and Gary Kail. Phillips and Kail were influenced by D. Boon and Mike Watt's New Alliance Records label and decided to create their own to promote bands they knew. Alongside New Alliance, New Underground was one of the first DIY labels in the South Bay punk scene of the 1980s.

Albums
Their compilitation album, Life Is Ugly So Why Not Kill Yourself, featured songs by Red Cross ("Rich Brat" from Red Cross), Descendents ("I Wanna Be a Bear" from Milo Goes to College), Minutemen ("Shit You Hear At Parties" from The Politics of Time), Saccharine Trust (Disillusion Fool), Mood of Defiance ("Empty Me" from Now), and Ill Will ("Paranoid Midnight Deposit".)  Kail came up with the title for the compilation.

Other compilations were entitled Life Is Beautiful So Why Not Eat Health Food? and Life Is Boring So Why Not Steal This Record?, with the latter featuring artwork by Raymond Pettibon. Phillips named these albums. A fourth was planned but never completed.

Discography
Mood of Defiance
Now (1982)
Anti
I Don't Want To Die In Your War (1982)
Defy The System (1983)
God Can't Bounce  (1984)
Zurich 1916
Creative Nihilism (1984)
Compilations
Life Is Beautiful So Why Not Eat Health Food? (1981)
Life Is Ugly So Why Not Kill Yourself (1982)
Life Is Boring So Why Not Steal This Record? (1983)

Legacy

Life Is Ugly So Why Not Kill Yourself was re-released by Delerium Records in 2001.

References

External links
New Underground Records at Discogs

American independent record labels
Record labels established in 1980
Punk record labels
Indie rock record labels
DIY culture